We Lived for Estonia  is a documentary film about the Forest brothers during World War II.

Plot
During June 1941, Nazi forces occupied Estonia. By 1944, when the Soviet-Nazi frontline was drawing towards the Estonian border from the East, Alfred Käärmann was conscripted into the German military. By September 1944 the Red Army had again occupied Estonia. Alfred was forced to make a decision: whether to stay in Estonia or retreat with the Germans. He chose the former, However he risked arrest and deportation by the Soviets. In order to survive, he, like many other Estonian men, took refuge in the forests. They were known as the Forest brothers. Alfred Käärmann discusses his experience with the Forest brothers.

References

External links
Nous vivions pour L’Estonie/We lived for Estonia

1997 films
Estonian-language films
Documentary films about World War II
Estonian documentary films
1997 documentary films